The Accreditation Council for Continuing Medical Education (ACCME) sets and enforces standards in physician continuing education (or 'lifelong learning') within the United States.  It acts as the overseeing body for institutions and organizations providing continuing medical education (CME) activities.
The Council's seven founding member organizations are the American Board of Medical Specialties (ABMS), the American Hospital Association (AHA), the American Medical Association (AMA), the Association of American Medical Colleges (AAMC), the Association for Hospital Medical Education (AHME), the Council of Medical Specialty Societies (CMSS), and the Federation of State Medical Boards (FSMB). These organizations established the ACCME in 1980. 
The ACCME sets standards and certifies that institutions and organizations meet those standards. "CME credit" is part of special programs offered by other organizations (e.g. the American Medical Association) and is not the purview of the ACCME.
The ACCME's mission is to provide those in the medical field with opportunities to maintain competence and learn about new and developing areas of their field. A voluntary self-regulated system and a peer-review process are used to regulate and accredit medical education providers.

The primary responsibilities of the ACCME are to:
 accredit institutions and organizations offering CME 
 define criteria for evaluation of educational programs and ensure compliance with these standards
 develop methods for measuring the effectiveness of CME and its accreditation

The 2017 ACCME annual report includes information on 1,794 accredited CME providers that offered 162,965 educational activities, comprising more than one million hours of instruction. These CME activities encompassed more than 28 million learner interactions, including physicians and other health care professionals.  the organisation has 31 employees.

References

External links

Medical education in the United States
Healthcare accreditation organizations in the United States